Kim Jeong-hun (born January 23, 1994), known professionally as Coogie, is a South Korean rapper and songwriter. He gained popularity when he appeared on Show Me The Money 777 in 2018. He signed to hip-hop label ATM Seoul where he released the studio album Up! (2020), extended plays Coogie (2018), Emo #1 (2018), and S.O.S (2019), and the mixtape I Got A Feeling (2021). In 2020, he released the single "Fadeaway" with Jvcki Wai, Paloalto, The Quiett, and Bassagong, which won Collaboration of the Year at the Korean Hip-hop Awards.

He signed to AOMG in 2022.

Early life 
Kim Jeong-hun was born on January 23, 1994, in Daejeon. He started listening to foreign hip-hop and writing lyrics when he was in the fifth grade.

Career

2018-2021: Show Me the Money 777 and Up! 
Coogie signed to ATM Seoul, a hip-hop label found by rapper Bill Stax. In March 2018, he released his debut single "HBK". In May 2018, he released his debut EP Coogie. In September 2018, he appeared on the rap competition TV show Show Me the Money 777 where he first garnered attention. He released the singles "Saimsaim" and "Watch Me Ballin'" on the show and finished in the Top 12. In December 2018, he released the EP EMO #1.  "Wifey", the single from the EP featuring rapper Changmo, received positive reviews from critics.

In March 2020, Coogie released his debut studio album Up!, which received critical acclaim. In May 2020, he released the single "Fadeaway" with rappers Jvcki Wai, Paloalto, The Quiett and Bassagong, which won Collaboration of the Year at the Korean Hip-hop Awards. In 2021, he released his debut mixtape I Got A Feeling.

2022: Signing to AOMG 
In 2022, Coogie signed to hip-hop label AOMG.

Artistry 
Coogie cited rappers Lil Uzi Vert, Famous Dex, and Rich the Kid as his biggest influence.

Discography

Studio album

EPs

Mixtape

Singles

Filmography

TV

Awards and nominations

Notes

References

External link 
 
1994 births
Living people
People from Daejeon
Show Me the Money (South Korean TV series) contestants
South Korean male rappers